Natalia Toledo (born 15 May 1972) is a Paraguayan athlete. She competed in the women's long jump at the 1992 Summer Olympics.

References

1972 births
Living people
Athletes (track and field) at the 1992 Summer Olympics
Paraguayan female long jumpers
Olympic athletes of Paraguay
Place of birth missing (living people)
20th-century Paraguayan women